Chaetophorocera is a genus of bristle flies in the family Tachinidae. There are at least two described species in Chaetophorocera.

Species
These two species belong to the genus Chaetophorocera:
 Chaetophorocera andina Townsend, 1912 c g
 Chaetophorocera fuscosa Townsend, 1912 c g
Data sources: i = ITIS, c = Catalogue of Life, g = GBIF, b = Bugguide.net

References

Further reading

External links

 
 

Tachinidae